Mount Arthur may refer to:
 Mount Arthur (Antarctica) in Antarctica
 Mount Arthur (New Zealand) in New Zealand
 Mount Arthur (Pentland Hills) in Scotland
 Mount Arthur (Nunavut) in Nunavut, Canada
 Mount Arthur (Tasmania) in Tasmania, Australia
 Mount Arthur (British Columbia) in British Columbia, Canada
 Mount Arthur (Washington) in the Olympic Mountains, USA